Julius Hoffensberg (20 July 1828 – 28 March 1895) was a Danish businessperson.

Early life and education
Hoffensberg was born in Copenhagen, the son of military officer and lithographer Frantz Hoffensberg (1804–419) and Else Kirstine Møller. His father was later married second time to Caroline Sørensen.

Hoffensberg  was educated as a typographer in W. Laub's book printing business in Nykøbing Falster and later worked as an assistant in the Ministry of Defence.

Career

In 1855, Hoffensberg  took over a lithographic business established by his  father in approximately 1844. The firm merged with Otto Schwartz' Eftf.s (E. Jespersens) book shop and Em. Bærentzen & Co.'s lithographic workshop under the name Hoffensberg, Jespersen og Trap in 1874. The firm also acquired G. S. Wibe's book printing business. Its name was changed to Hoffensberg & Fr. Trap in 1878. Hoffensberg   headed the firm and was its sole owner in 1882–87. An eye disease forced him to retire in 1888. It was two years later converted into an aktieselskab under the name Det Hoffensbergske Etablissement. It was liquidized in 1972.

Hoffensberg  and  N. K. Strøyberg were in around 1769 also the owners of Silkeborg Paper Factory.

Personal life
Julius Hoffensberg married twice. Jis first wife was Emilie Mathilde Barbara Fahrner (1836-1871), a daughter of master tailor and later owner of Bavnegård at Gentofte Michael Fahrner (ca. 1805–55) and Maria Catharina Hansen (c. 1795–1865). They married on 8 February 1861 in the Church of Our Lady in Copenhagen. His second wife was Emma Josephine Margrethe Withusen (1835-1926), a daughter of farmer Peter Nielsen  Withusen  (Berring) of Rygård at Hellerup (c. 1806–47) and Emilie Jacobine Klepser (c. 1811–95). They married on 19 November 1872.

Hoffensberg died on  28 March 1895 and is buried at Gentofte Cemetery.

References

External links

Source

1828 births
1895 deaths
People from Copenhagen
19th-century Danish businesspeople
Danish printers